Awad Salah Nasser (born 26 September 1975) is a Yemeni middle-distance runner who competed internationally for Yemen at the 1992 Summer Olympics.

Career
Nasser was just 16 years old when he competed in the 1500 metres at the 1992 Summer Olympics held in Barcelona, Spain, he ran in heat 2 of the first round and finished in 11th position out of 13, so didn't qualify for the next round.

References

External links
 

1975 births
Living people
Yemeni male middle-distance runners
Olympic athletes of Yemen
Athletes (track and field) at the 1992 Summer Olympics